The Qatari Second Division, QSD or Second Division League, also was known as Qatargas League due to sponsorship reasons, is the second tier of football league competition in Qatar. Contested by 8 teams, it operates on a system of promotion and relegation with the Qatar Stars League (QSL). Seasons of the QSD run from September to April.

The league's first season was played in 1979 which was won by Al-Ittihad. The club with the most QSD wins is Al-Markhiya which has won 6 QSD titles. According to the league's development strategy, starting with the 2022-23 season, the first-placed club of this league will play a relegation match against the tenth-placed club of the first league to decide which club will participate in the first league next season. There is no relegation from the second division.

History 
It was announced on 15 April 2009 that no clubs would be relegated from the top flight in the 2008–09 season, due to expansion reasons, however the announcement was made with only one game remaining. This meant that the Qatari Second Division would remain with the same number of teams despite the recent formation of Lekhwiya SC and El Jaish SC, while the top flight would expand to 12 teams.

On 6 October 2013 it was announced Qatari Second Division had a sponsorship with Qatargas.

Clubs

Champions

2022–23 season

Championship history

Total titles won by town or city

Top scorers
1998–99:  Osama Adam (13 goals) 
2007–08:  Gonzalo Gutiérrez (15 goals)
2008–09:  Gonzalo Gutiérrez (14 goals)
2010–11:  Abdulqadir Ilyas (12 goals)
2011–12:  Michaël N'dri (16 goals)
2012–13:  Jean-Paul Eale Lutula (13 goals)
2013–14:  Ali Ferydoon (19 goals)
2014–15:
2015–16:
2016–17:
2017–18:
2018–19:
2019–20:
2020–21:  Baha' Faisal (18 goals)

References

External links
Official Website

 
Second level football leagues in Asia
Football leagues in Qatar
Sports leagues established in 1963